The Madrid Open was an annual men's golf tournament which was held in and around the Spanish capital Madrid from 1968 to 2007, apart from a seven-year gap from 1994 to 2000. 

It was an official money event on the European Tour since the tour's first official season in 1972 until 2007. Spain was the only country other than the UK which hosted more than one event in 1972, the other tournament in the country being the Spanish Open. 

The tournament has had several sponsored names over the years. In 2006 the tournament moved to a new slot and was played the same September week as the 16-man HSBC World Match Play Championship. The 2006 prize fund was €1 million, which is one of the smaller purses on the European Tour. In 2007, the event moved to October, but it was once again be an alternate event to the HSBC World Match Play Championship, which was also rescheduled. It was dropped from the 2008 schedule, with a new tournament named the Madrid Masters taking its place.

Winners

External links
Coverage on the European Tour's official site

Former European Tour events
Golf tournaments in Spain
Defunct sports competitions in Spain